Galmoylestown may refer to the following places in the Republic of  Ireland:

Galmoylestown Lower
Galmoylestown Upper